Clement Hue  (1779 – 23 June 1861) was a British physician.

Early life and education
Hue was born in Jersey, the son of John Hue. He was educated at John Roysse's Free School in Abingdon, (now Abingdon School). He later studied at Pembroke College, Oxford where he was a scholar and fellow and gained a D.Med.

Career
He was physician to St Bartholomew's Hospital, Christ's Hospital, and to the Foundling Hospital from 1815–1837 and Vice President of the latter from 1847–1861 and M.I. Chapel of Foundling Hospital. He was a fellow and Registrar of the Royal College of Physicians from 1815–1824. and served as one of the RCP's Commissioners for Madhouses.

He gave the Harveian Oration in 1829.

See also
 List of Old Abingdonians

References 

1770s births
1861 deaths
19th-century English medical doctors
Alumni of Pembroke College, Oxford
Fellows of the Royal College of Physicians
People educated at Abingdon School